The Brisbane Broncos rugby league football club has maintained team and individual player records since they entered the Winfield Cup premiership in 1988.

Game records

Biggest wins

Biggest losses

Attendances

Home

Other

Individual records

Most First Grade Games
355, Darren Lockyer (1995–2011)
347, Corey Parker (2001–2016)
304, Sam Thaiday (2003–2018)
285, Alex Glenn (2009–2021)
274, Michael Hancock (1988–2000)
260, Andrew McCullough (2008–2020)
258, Allan Langer (1988–1999, 2002)
255, Andrew Gee (1989–1999, 2002–2003)
254, Shane Webcke (1995–2006)
241, Kevin Walters (1990–2001)

Most Points For Club
1,328 (39 tries, 586 goals), Corey Parker (2001–2016)
1,191 (122 tries, 341 goals, 21 field goals), Darren Lockyer (1995–2011)
1,062 (64 tries, 403 goals), Michael De Vere (1997–2004, 2009)
744 (29 tries, 314 goals), Terry Matterson (1988–1995)
568 (142 tries), Steve Renouf (1989–1999)
530 (24 tries, 216 goals, 2 field goals), Jamayne Isaako (2017–2022)

Most Tries For Club
142, Steve Renouf (1989–1999)
122, Darren Lockyer (1995–2011)
122, Wendell Sailor (1993–2001)
120, Michael Hancock (1988–2000)
117, Corey Oates (2013–)
100, Allan Langer (1988–1999, 2002)
77, Shaun Berrigan (1999–2007)
73, Justin Hodges (2000–2001, 2005–2015)
72, Willie Carne (1990–1996)
64, Kevin Walters (1990–2001)
64, Michael De Vere (1997–2004, 2009)

Most tries in a match

Most goals in a match

Most points in a match

Most tries in a season

Most points in a season

Coaches

Comebacks

Biggest comeback win
Recovered from an 22-point deficit.

Trailed Gold Coast Titans 22–0 after 18 minutes to win 36–28 at Suncorp Stadium in round 8, 2021.

Worst collapse
Surrendered a 22-point lead.

Led Cronulla Sharks 22–0 after 53 minutes to lose 24–22 at Suncorp Stadium in round 16, 2014.

Streaks

Longest winning streaks
 12 Matches (Round 14, 1997 to Round 5, 1998)
 11 Matches (Round 8 to Round 18, 1990)
 11 Matches (Round 11 to Round 23, 1999)
 10 Matches (Round 16, 1992 to Round 1, 1993)
 10 Matches (Round 5 to Round 15, 2005)

Longest losing streaks
 13 Matches (Round 10, 2020 to Round 2, 2021)  
 8 Matches (Round 20 to Finals Week 1, 2003)
 8 Matches (Round 22, 2005 to Round 1, 2006)
 6 Matches (Round 20 to 25, 2001)

Golden point games

Biggest wins and losses (by opponent)

All Time Premiership Record 1988–2015

Finals records

Finals appearances
1990, 1992, 1993, 1994, 1995, 1996, 1997, 1998, 1999, 2000, 2001, 2002, 2003, 2004, 2005, 2006, 2007, 2008, 2009, 2011, 2012, 2014, 2015, 2016, 2017, 2018, 2019

Biggest wins

Biggest losses

Most finals wins in a row
 7 Matches, Semi-final, 1992 – Qualifying Final, 1994.

Most finals losses in a row
 7 Matches, Preliminary Final, 2002 – Qualifying Final, 2006.

Biggest comeback in a final
Trailed a 14-point deficit (three times).
 Trailed the Cronulla Sharks 20–6 after 41 minutes to win 34–20 at ANZ Stadium (Qualifying Final, 2000).
 Trailed the Canterbury Bulldogs 20–6 after 44 minutes to win 37–20 at SFS (Preliminary Final, 2006).
 Trailed the Sydney Roosters 16–2 after 33 minutes to win 24–16 at SFS (Qualifying Final 2008).

Worst collapse in a final
Surrendered a 12-point lead.
 Led the Melbourne Storm 12–0 after 45 minutes to lose 16–14 at Suncorp Stadium (Semi-final, 2008).

Individual records in finals

Most points in a finals match
 16 Points (4 tries), Wendell Sailor against St. George Illawarra Dragons (Semi-final, 2001), Brisbane won 44–28.
 16 Points (8 goals), Corey Parker against Newcastle Knights (Semi-final, 2006), Brisbane won 50–6.

Most tries in a finals match
 4 Tries, Wendell Sailor against St. George Illawarra Dragons (Semi-final, 2001), Brisbane won 44–28.

Most goals in a finals match
 8 Goals, Corey Parker against Newcastle Knights (Semi-final, 2006), Brisbane won 50–6.

Most field goals in a finals match
 1 Field Goal, Allan Langer against Canterbury Bulldogs (Preliminary Final, 1993), Brisbane won 23–16.
 1 Field Goal, Darren Lockyer against Canterbury Bulldogs (Preliminary Final, 2006), Brisbane won 37–20.
 1 Field Goal, Darren Lockyer against Melbourne Storm (Grand Final, 2006), Brisbane won 15–8.
 1 Field Goal, Darren Lockyer against St. George-Illawarra Dragons (Semi-final, 2011), Brisbane won 13–12.
 1 Field Goal, Anthony Milford against Sydney Roosters (Preliminary Final, 2015), Brisbane won 31–12.

Grand Final records

Premierships

Runners-up

2015
The Brisbane Broncos lost to the North Queensland Cowboys in an all Queensland affair.

Biggest win
26 Points, Brisbane Broncos defeated Canterbury Bulldogs 38–12 in 1998.

Most points in a Grand Final
38 Points, Brisbane Broncos defeated Canterbury Bulldogs 38–12 in 1998.

Biggest comeback in a Grand Final
Recovered from a 2-point deficit (twice).
Trailed the Canterbury Bulldogs 12–10 after 45 minutes to win 38–12 in 1998.
Trailed the Melbourne Storm 4–2 after 19 minutes to win 15–8 in 2006.

Individual Records in Grand Finals

Most Grand Final appearances as a Coach

Most Grand Final appearances as a captain

Most Grand Final appearances as a player

Most tries in a Grand Final

Most tries in Grand Finals

Most goals in a Grand Final

Most goals in Grand Finals

Most field goals in a Grand Final

Most points in a Grand Final

Most points in Grand Finals

National Youth Competition records

Biggest wins

Biggest losses

Streaks

Longest winning streak

9 matches, 12 June – 16 August 2009

Longest losing streak

13 Matches (Round 10 to Round 2, 2021)

Comebacks

Biggest comeback win

Trailed an 18-point deficit.
Trailed the Canberra Raiders 18–0 at half time to win 30–28 at Suncorp Stadium on 29 April 2006.

Worst collapse
Surrendered a 22-point lead.
Led the Cronulla Sharks 22–0 after 53 minutes to lose 24–22 at Suncorp Stadium on 27 June 2014.

Brisbane Broncos Win–loss records

Active Teams

Discontinued Team

See also

References

Records
National Rugby League lists
Australian records
Rugby league records and statistics
Brisbane sport-related lists